Augusto Laranja (born 15 April 1992) is a Brazilian tennis player.

Laranja has a career high ATP singles ranking of 584 achieved on 17 December 2012. He also has a career high ATP doubles ranking of 327 achieved on 6 May 2013.

Laranja made his ATP main draw debut at the 2011 Brasil Open in the doubles draw partnering Fernando Romboli.

Career titles

Doubles: 2 (2 ITF)

References

External links

1992 births
Living people
Brazilian male tennis players
21st-century Brazilian people
20th-century Brazilian people